Une vie, or Une Vie, may refer to:

Books
Une vie, 1883 novel by Guy de Maupassant
Une vie, autobiography of Simone Veil

Film and TV
One Life (1958 film) (French: Une vie), film adaption of the Maupassant story 

A Woman's Life (film) (French: Une vie), a film directed by Stéphane Brizé

Music
Une vie, 1971 album by Dalida.
"Une Vie", song by Dalida and the title song of the album.
Une Vie (d'Art et d'Amour), compilation album by Maria Callas
"Une Vie", theme song from One Life (1958 film)

See also
"Une vie d'amour" (A Life of Love), song written by Charles Aznavour
Une vie meilleure, 2011 French film 
Une vie de chat, 2010 French animated film
Une vie chinoise, French graphic novel